Narrandera Airport (also known as Narrandera-Leeton Airport)  is a small regional airport in the local government area of Narrandera in the Riverina region of New South Wales, Australia. The airport services the towns of Leeton and Narrandera as it is located between the two towns.

The Riverina Drag Racing Association holds their drag racing event four times a year at the airport.

The airport received $109,000 in funds for security upgrades in 2006.

RAAF Station Narrandera
The aerodrome was acquired in 1940 as a station for the Royal Australian Air Force's No. 8 Elementary Flying Training School, under the wartime Empire Air Training Scheme. The station closed after the end of hostilities in 1945.

Airlines and destinations

See also
List of airports in New South Wales

References

External links

Official site

Airports in New South Wales
Airports established in 1940